The Kansas State Wildcats women's basketball program is the intercollegiate basketball program of the Kansas State Wildcats. The program is classified in the NCAA Division I, and the team competes in the Big 12 Conference.

The team has been invited to 22 NCAA and AIAW tournaments (second-most among Big 12 teams), and was crowned champion of the 2006 Women's National Invitation Tournament. Kansas State is in the top 20 all-time for wins among Division I programs.

The team's head coach is Jeff Mittie. He was hired before the 2014–2015 season, after spending the prior fifteen seasons at TCU.

History
Kansas State began offering women's basketball as an organized intercollegiate sport in the 1968–1969 school year, under head coach Judy Akers.  Because the NCAA did not sponsor women's sports until 1982, the governing bodies for women's basketball in the earliest years were the Commission on Intercollegiate Athletics for Women (CIAW) and the AIAW.

The Big Eight Conference likewise did not sponsor women's basketball in its earliest years, so Kansas State competed against the University of Kansas, Wichita State, and other state schools for the "Kansas State Conference" championship. Kansas State won eight straight Kansas Conference titles, from 1972 to 1979. The Big Eight Conference began offering a mid-season basketball tournament in the 1975–1976 season, and then began sponsoring a regular season competition in 1982–1983.  Kansas State won the first two Big Eight tournament titles, in 1976 and 1977, and then won the first two Big Eight regular season titles, in 1983 and 1984.

The longest-tenured and winningest head coach in team history is Deb Patterson. Patterson spent eighteen years at Kansas State and compiled a 350–226 record. She won two Big 12 Conference titles (2004 and 2008) and a WNIT title (2006). Before Patterson, the winningest coach at Kansas State was Judy Akers, the first coach in program history, who compiled a 206–94 record.  Akers also captured eight Kansas State Conference titles (1972-1979) and the first two titles in the Big Eight Conference after it began sponsoring women's basketball (1976 and 1977 mid-season tournaments).

Postseason history

AIAW tournament results
The Wildcats appeared in six AIAW tournaments prior to the creation of the NCAA tournament. In 1971, Kansas State also appeared in the even earlier tournament sponsored by the Commission on Intercollegiate Athletics for Women (CIAW), advancing to the Elite Eight.

The Wildcats had a combined record of 7–10.

NCAA tournament results
The first tournament the NCAA sponsored was the 1982 edition. Kansas State has appeared in 17 NCAA tournaments since that time, with a record of 13–16.13-16 RECORD DOES NOT INCLUDE 2022

NCAA Tournament seeding history

WNIT results
Kansas State has appeared in the Women's National Invitation Tournament eight times, including the first tournament held, in 1969. Kansas State won the tournament in 2006 and reached the semifinals (final four) again in 2007 and 2013.

Notable Wildcat players and coaches
 Judy Akers — 2003 KSU Hall of Fame Inductee
 Brittany Chambers
 Kamie Ethridge — KSU assistant coach, now head coach at Washington State
 Olga Firsova
 Priscilla Gary-Sweeney — 1998 KSU Hall of Fame Inductee
 Marlies Gipson
 Lynn Hickey — 2004 KSU Hall of Fame Inductee
 Lynn Holzman — West Coast Conference commissioner, 2014–present
 Laurie Koehn
 Shalee Lehning
 Breanna Lewis
 Megan Mahoney
 Nicole Ohlde
 Shanele Stires
 Kendra Wecker

Draft history

Head coaches
Judy Akers (1968-1979)
Lynn Hickey (1979-1984)
Matilda Mossman (1984-1989)
Gaye Griffin (1989-1990)
Susan Yow (1990-1993)
Brian Agler (1993-1996)
Jack Hartman (1996; coached final seven games)
Deb Patterson (1996-2014)
Jeff Mittie (2014–present)

Year by year results
The Big Eight Conference began sponsoring a mid-season tournament in the 1975–1976 season, but no regular season competition until 1982–1983. Kansas State competed for "Kansas State Conference" regular season titles in the years before the Big Eight began offering regular season competition.

Series records

Record vs. Big 12 opponents

Record vs. former Big 12 opponents

See also
 Kansas State Wildcats men's basketball

References

External links